Alfredo Deza Fuller (born 24 June 1944) is a Peruvian hurdler. He competed in the men's 110 metres hurdles at the 1968 Summer Olympics.

His son Alfredo Deza Ganoza was a high jumper.

References

1944 births
Living people
Athletes (track and field) at the 1968 Summer Olympics
Peruvian male hurdlers
Olympic athletes of Peru
Place of birth missing (living people)